Courtesy tenure (or curtesy/courtesy of England) is the legal term denoting  the life interest which a widower (i.e. former husband) may claim in the lands of his deceased wife, under certain conditions. The tenure relates only to those lands of which his wife was in her lifetime actually seised (or sasined in Scots law) and not therefore to an estate of inheritance.

The customs and the meaning of the word has considerable doubt. It has been said to be a tenure peculiar to England and to Scotland, hence called the courtesy of England and the courtesy of Scotland, yet this is erroneous, for it is found also in Germany and France. The Mirroir des Justices ascribes its introduction to King Henry I(1100–1135). The historian K.E. Digby states it to be connected with curia, having reference either to the attendance of the husband as tenant of the lands at the lord's court, or to mean simply that the husband is acknowledged tenant by the courts of England.

The requisites necessary to create a tenancy by courtesy are:
 A legal marriage must have existed;
 The estate claimed in courtesy must have been an estate in possession of which the wife must have been actually seised; and,
 Issue must have existed born alive and during the mother's existence, though it is immaterial whether the issue subsequently live or die, or whether it is born before or after the wife's seisin.

In the case of lands held under gavelkind tenure the husband has a right to courtesy tenure whether there is issue born or not but the courtesy extends only to a moiety (i.e. half) of the wife's lands and ceases if the husband marries again. The issue must have been capable of inheriting as heir to the wife, so that if for example  a wife were seised of lands in tail male the birth of a daughter would not entitle the husband to a tenancy by courtesy.
 The title to the tenancy vests only on the death of the wife.

The Married Women's Property Act 1882 has not affected the right of courtesy so far as relates to the wife's undisposed-of realty, and the Settled Land Act 1884, section 8, provides that for the purposes of the Settled Land Act 1882 the estate of a tenant by courtesy is to be deemed an estate arising under a settlement made by the wife.

The application of Courtesy (as spelled in Scots law) was abolished by Section 10 of the Succession (Scotland) Act 1964, in respect of all deaths occurring after the date of that Act. The right of Terce (being the equivalent claim by a wife on her husband's estate) was also abolished by the same provision.

See also
Dower
Elective share
Jointure
Land tenure

References

Widowhood in the United Kingdom
Property law of the United Kingdom
Scots law legal terminology
Land tenure
Marriage, unions and partnerships in Scotland
Marriage, unions and partnerships in England
Men's rights
Men in the United Kingdom